Upekṣā (Sanskrit: उपेक्षा; Pali: Upekkhā) is the Buddhist concept of equanimity. As one of the Brahma-viharas, virtues of the "Brahma realm", it is one of the wholesome mental factors cultivated on the Buddhist path to nirvāna through the practice of jhāna.

Pali literature

Many passages in the Pali Canon and post-canonical commentary identify upekkha as an important aspect of spiritual development. It is one of the Four Sublime States (brahmavihara), which are purifying mental states capable of counteracting the defilements of lust, aversion and ignorance. As a brahmavihara, it is also one of the forty traditionally identified subjects of Buddhist meditation (kammatthana). In the Theravada list of ten pāramī (perfections), upekkha is the last-identified bodhisatta practice, and in the Seven Factors of Enlightenment (bojjhanga), it is the ultimate characteristic to develop.

To practice upekkha is to be unwavering or to stay neutral in the face of the eight vicissitudes of life—which are otherwise known as the eight worldly winds or eight worldly conditions: loss and gain, good-repute and ill-repute, praise and censure, and sorrow and happiness (the Attha Loka Dhamma).

The "far enemy" of Upekkha is greed and resentment, or mind-states in obvious opposition. The "near enemy" (the quality which superficially resembles upekkha but which subtly opposes it), is indifference or apathy.

In the development of meditative concentration, upekkha arises as the quintessential factor of material absorption, present in the third and fourth jhana states:

Contemporary exposition
American Buddhist monk Bhikkhu Bodhi wrote: 
"The real meaning of upekkha is equanimity, not indifference in the sense of unconcern for others. As a spiritual virtue, upekkha means stability in the face of the fluctuations of worldly fortune. It is evenness of mind, unshakeable freedom of mind, a state of inner equipoise that cannot be upset by gain and loss, honor and dishonor, praise and blame, pleasure and pain. Upekkha is freedom from all points of self-reference; it is indifference only to the demands of the ego-self with its craving for pleasure and position, not to the well-being of one's fellow human beings. True equanimity is the pinnacle of the four social attitudes that the Buddhist texts call the 'divine abodes': boundless loving-kindness, compassion, altruistic joy, and equanimity. The last does not override and negate the preceding three, but perfects and consummates them."

See also

References

Wholesome factors in Buddhism
Sanskrit words and phrases